is a 1968 Japanese pink film directed by Kan Mukai.
It is in the Part color-format which was common with Pink films in the late 1960s and early 1970s before Nikkatsu's entry into the genre with their Roman Porno films.

Synopsis
The film depicts the plight of a female office worker whose boss introduces her to the world of pornographic films.

Cast
 Mari Nagisa as Maya (typist)
 Kemi Ichiboshi
 Norihiro Ōtani as Kunio
 Mitsugu Fujii
 Risa Minakami

Background
Director Kan Mukai often capitalized on controversy to boost the publicity surrounding the release of his films. In the case of Blue Film: Estimation, the advertising campaign emphasizing the appearance of mainstream actress Mitsugu Fujii in this pink film created enough public notice to make the film a success. Fujii would again work with Mukai in his Blue Film Woman (1969).

Bibliography

English

Japanese

Notes

1968 films
Films directed by Kan Mukai
1960s Japanese-language films
Pink films
1960s Japanese films